Ansley Gray (May 20, 1854 – February 3, 1889) was a member of the Wisconsin State Assembly.

Biography
Gray was born on May 20, 1854, in Mineral Point, Wisconsin. He attended Beloit College and the University of Wisconsin Law School. Gray died at his home in Oberlin, Ohio, on February 3, 1889.

Career
Gray was elected to the Assembly in 1875, succeeding Owen King. He was a member of the Reform Party. He then became a member of the Temperance movement, delivering lectures at Chautauqua assemblies.

References

People from Mineral Point, Wisconsin
Members of the Wisconsin State Assembly
Wisconsin Reformers (19th century)
19th-century American politicians
Beloit College alumni
University of Wisconsin Law School alumni
1854 births
1889 deaths